Virtual Karts is a video game developed by MPS Labs and published by MicroProse for DOS in 1995.

Gameplay
Virtual Karts is a go-kart simulation game.

Reception
Next Generation reviewed the PC version of the game, rating it three stars out of five, and stated that "It would have been a much better game if MPS Labs would have committed to the arcade quality and thrown in a few power-ups to supercharge your kart along the way. At the very least, it would have made things interesting."

Reviews
PC Gamer Vol. 3 No. 3 (1996 March)
PC Games - Dec, 1995
PC Player - Jan, 1996
Joystick (French) (Feb, 1996)
Coming Soon Magazine (Feb 14, 1996)
PC Multimedia & Entertainment (Feb 06, 1996)
Power Play (Jan, 1996) (German)

References

1995 video games
DOS games
DOS-only games
Kart racing video games
Video games developed in the United States